Mourad Jabrane is a retired Moroccan football defender.

References

Year of birth missing (living people)
Living people
Moroccan footballers
Maghreb de Fès players
Botola players
Association football defenders
Morocco international footballers
1988 African Cup of Nations players